Tiana Le is an American actress, best known for her appearances on Insecure and No Good Nick. She currently stars in the Disney+ original series, Big Shot.

Early life and education
Le is half African-American and half Vietnamese. She and her brother, TaeVeon, were raised by a single mother, An Le. The siblings are second-generation Americans, as An relocated from Vietnam in 1975 as an infant during the Vietnam War. Le described herself as a "natural performer" growing up. Le attended Corona del Mar High School in Newport Beach, California, where she participated in the musical theater program as it combined her acting and musical talents. In 2021, Le started college at the University of Southern California where she planned to study acting and film making.

Career
Le booked her first major television role in 8th grade with her recurring role on Issa Rae's Insecure, on HBO. Le credited Rae with helping her understand that she had to create opportunities for herself. Le next appeared in Amazon Prime Video's Just Add Magic. In 2017, Le originated the role of Trina Robinson on the ABC soap opera, General Hospital. Le appeared in three episodes between 2017 and 2018. In 2019, Le booked a recurring role on the Netflix comedic drama, No Good Nick. In 2021, Le joined the cast of Big Shots as Destiny, in her first series regular role, opposite John Stamos and Yvette Nicole Brown. Le admitted that it was the kind of role she had been working her entire life for. She also hoped her presence onscreen would serve as representation for people of Afro-Asian heritage.

Filmography

References

Living people
African-American actresses
21st-century American actresses
21st-century African-American women
21st-century African-American people
American people of Vietnamese descent
Actresses of Vietnamese descent
Year of birth missing (living people)